Isoetes valida, commonly known as the strong quillwort or true quillwort, is an aquatic lycophyte native to eastern North America. It is found primarily in the Appalachian Mountains from Pennsylvania south to Alabama and Georgia. In addition, one collection of the plant was made in a railway ditch in Wilmington, Delaware in the 1860s, but this was most likely an accidental introduction.

Some sources consider Isoetes caroliniana a synonym of this species, others regard it as a separate species.

References

External links
Profile at USDA PLANTS Database
Range Map from Flora of North America
Illustration from Flora of North America (under the synonym Isoetes caroliniana)
wikiPlants - Isoetes valida (Engelm.) Clute

valida
Flora of the Eastern United States
Plants described in 1867